The Vallée du Rhône of Rhône Valley is a region located on either side of the Rhône, downstream from Lyon, in the south-east of France The city of Valence in Drôme is considered the heart of the valley.

References 

Rhône
Valleys
Geography of Provence-Alpes-Côte d'Azur
Geography of Auvergne-Rhône-Alpes
Geography of Occitania (administrative region)
Valleys of France